Kofi Omar Josephs (born 13 September 1991) is a British basketball player who last played in the British Basketball League for Plymouth City Patriots. He also plays for the British national team.

Professional career
Josephs spent the 2017–18 season with the Glasgow Rocks and averaged 13.5 points, 3.6 rebounds and 2.2 assists per game. On 21 August 2018, he signed with BC Boncourt.

In January 2019, Josephs signed with Úrvalsdeild karla club Breiðablik. In February 2019, he reached an agreement with Breiðablik to allow him to sign with Nässjö Basket of the Swedish Basketligan. In 7 games with Breiðablik, he averaged 18.1 points per game.

On 24 July 2019, Josephs was unveiled as the first signing of BBL team Worcester Wolves for the 2019–20 season.

In early November 2021, Josephs joined the Plymouth City Patriots after an 18-month hiatus from basketball activities. On 21 November 2021, Josephs scored 46 points in a narrow overtime home loss to the Manchester Giants, the record for the most points scored in a game in BBL history by a British-born player, shooting 15-26 from the field alongside 8 assists, 3 rebounds and 3 steals.

On 2 March 2022, Josephs tended his resignation from the Plymouth City Patriots roster with immediate effect citing personal reasons.

National team career
He participated at the EuroBasket 2017 with the British national team.

References

1991 births
Living people
Basketball players at the 2018 Commonwealth Games
Breiðablik men's basketball players
British expatriate basketball people in Iceland
British expatriate basketball people in Germany
British expatriate basketball people in Spain
British expatriate basketball people in the United States
Black British sportsmen
English expatriate sportspeople in Germany
English expatriate sportspeople in Spain
English men's basketball players
John Brown Golden Eagles men's basketball players
Fort Lewis Skyhawks men's basketball players
Glasgow Rocks players
Shooting guards
Worcester Wolves players
Plymouth City Patriots players
Sportspeople from Birmingham, West Midlands
Úrvalsdeild karla (basketball) players
Commonwealth Games competitors for England
English expatriate sportspeople in the United States
English expatriate sportspeople in Iceland